It's News to Me is an American panel game show produced by Mark Goodson and Bill Todman for CBS Television.  It was a derivative of Goodson-Todman's own panel show What's My Line?.  Originally aired as a one-time special on May 11, 1951; It debuted as a series July 2, 1951 to August 27, 1954.

Host and panelists

The original series was hosted by veteran radio and television newsman John Charles Daly, concurrent with his regular hosting duties on What's My Line.  CBS newsman Walter Cronkite would eventually host the 1954 version.

Among the celebrities who would appear as panelists were actresses Anna Lee and Nina Foch, journalist Quincy Howe, TV hostess Robin Chandler, radio host and storyteller John Henry Faulk, New York Yankees play-by-play announcer Mel Allen, and writer Quentin Reynolds.

Game play

Each typical episode contained two contestant rounds, followed by a newsmaker round, and occasionally followed by an additional contestant round.

Contestant round

Each round was a bluffing game where contestants attempted to determine if an answer that was given by one of the panelists was true or false.

The contestant was staked to $25 at the beginning of the game.  The contestant and panelists were then shown an item or items including props, drawings, photographs, or motion picture/newsreel footage.  Sometimes a dramatic performance (example: Goodson-Todman staffer Frank Wayne appears giving part of a speech) was presented.  A panelist chosen by the emcee would then supply a story that would tie the item to a news event, past or present.  The contestant would then decide if the panelist's story was true or false.  The contestant earned $5 for a correct decision and $5 was deducted for an incorrect decision.  Play continued until all four panelists had played and the contestant kept whatever money that was earned at the end.

Newsmaker round

In this round, eyewitnesses or participants involved with news events in the past or present would play a game similar to "I've Got a Secret".  The panelists would question the newsmaker to determine the identity of the news event.  If the panel failed to identify the event, the newsmaker would receive $100.

Broadcast history

The first episode aired as a one-off special May 11, 1951.

In mid-1951, CBS was forced to cancel its popular dramedy The Goldbergs after its creator Gertrude Berg refused to cooperate with the Hollywood blacklist and General Foods withdrew its sponsorship. The first show commissioned to replace The Goldbergs was the game show Who's Whose; Who's Whose proved to be such a disaster that it was pulled from the air after a single episode. It's News to Me was put into production to fill the same time slot, making its debut July 2.). It's News to Me ran until September 12, 1953.  The show returned July 9 to August 27, 1954 as a summer replacement for Person to Person.

When It's News to Me began its run, it was sponsored by General Foods, continuing its sponsorship of the slot from The Goldbergs. Beginning on October 4, 1952, the Simmons bedding company began sponsoring the program, with Andrew Jergens Company as the alternate sponsor beginning on October 11, 1952. It was later sponsored by Alcoa, and the 1954 edition by Amoco.

Episode status

Like other live broadcast series of the time, It's News to Me was recorded via kinescope onto film and the status of most of the episodes is unknown.  As of summer 2009, only two John Daly-hosted episodes have aired on GSN as part of its black and white programming blocks, and a portion of a Walter Cronkite-hosted episode exists as part of a 1992 birthday tribute tape for producer Mark Goodson.

On September 15, 2017 and January 16, 2023, BUZZR aired an episode as part of their "Lost and Found" series.

References

External links
 It's News to Me on IMDb

1951 American television series debuts
1954 American television series endings
American panel games
1950s American game shows
Black-and-white American television shows
CBS original programming
Television series by Mark Goodson-Bill Todman Productions
Panel games
Television series by CBS Studios